Fascism Today: A World Survey is a book by the historian Angelo Del Boca, writing with Mario Giovana.  It is a survey of radical right-wing movements, from the roots of fascism to a present-day (1960s) country-by-country discussion.

It was originally published in Milan, Italy as I "figli del sole" by Feltrinelli Editore in 1965.  Translated, from the Italian, by R. H. Boothroyd, it was first published in English, in a 532-page hardcover, by Pantheon Books in 1969.  Heinemann in London republished it in 1970.

1965 non-fiction books
Books about the far right
Anti-fascist books
Pantheon Books books